The 1926 Yale Bulldogs football team represented Yale University in the 1926 college football season. The Bulldogs finished with a 4–4 record under ninth-year head coach Tad Jones.

Neither the Associated Press nor Collier's Weekly selected any Yale players for their 1926 College Football All-America Teams. However, Yale guard Herbert Sturhahn was named a first-team All-American for 1926 by the All-American Board composed of three coaches, Knute Rockne, Glenn Scobey Warner and Yale's Tad Jones. Sturhahn was also later inducted into the College Football Hall of Fame.

Schedule

References

Yale
Yale Bulldogs football seasons
Yale Bulldogs football